Ko Ko Hein (born 27 August 1994) is a footballer from Burma, and a defender for the Myanmar national football team and Myanmar U-22 football team.
Hein currently plays for Yadanarbon FC in Myanmar National League. In November 2016, Hein transferred to Yadanarbon FC.

References

1994 births
Living people
Sportspeople from Yangon
Burmese footballers
Myanmar international footballers
Yadanarbon F.C. players
Zwegabin United F.C. players
Association football forwards
Southeast Asian Games silver medalists for Myanmar
Southeast Asian Games medalists in football
Competitors at the 2015 Southeast Asian Games